Petr Pála and Pavel Vízner were the defending champions, but Vizner chose not to participate, and only Pala competed that year.
Pala partnered with David Škoch, but lost in the first round to Juan Ignacio Chela and Fernando González.

Mariusz Fyrstenberg and Marcin Matkowski won in the final 6–4, 6–2, against Tomas Behrend and Christopher Kas.

Seeds

Draw

Draw

External links
Draw

Doubles